The article lists the state of race relations and racism in a number of countries.

Various forms of racism are practiced in most countries on Earth. In individual countries, the forms of racism which are practiced may be motivated by historic, cultural, religious, economic or demographic reasons. Wars created sentiments of ultra-nationalism, ethnic pride and racism.

Racism is widely condemned throughout the world, with 88 states being signatories of the International Convention on the Elimination of All Forms of Racial Discrimination .

 Racism in the Middle East
 Racism in the Arab world
 Racism in Asia
 Racism in China
 Racism in India
 Racism in Israel
 Racism in Japan
 Racism in the Philippines
 Racism in Malaysia 
 Racism in North Korea
 Racism in South Korea 
 Racism in Thailand
 Racism in UAE 
 Racism in Vietnam
 Racism in Indonesia
Racism in Africa
Racism in Libya
Racism in South Africa
Racism in Sudan
Racism in Zimbabwe
Racism in Europe
Racism in Austria
Racism in Belarus
Racism in France 
Racism in Finland
Racism in Germany
Racism in Italy 
Racism in Iceland 
Racism in Latvia 
Racism in Lithuania
Racism in Poland 
Racism in Portugal 
Racism in Romania 
Racism in Russia
Racism in Sweden 
Racism in Spain 
Racism in the Soviet Union
Racism in Ukraine 
Racism in the United Kingdom
Racism in North America
Racism in Canada
Racism in Mexico
Racism in the Dominican Republic
Racism in the United States
Racism in Columbus, Ohio
Racism in Puerto Rico 
Racism in Oregon
Racism in Oceania
Racism in Australia
Racism in South America
Racism in Argentina
Racism in Cuba 
Racism in Chile
Racism in Brazil

See also 

Committee on the Elimination of Racial Discrimination
 Human rights by country

References

External links